Westerhof is a Dutch toponymic surname, meaning "western homestead/farm". The surname originates from a number of farms. Notable people with the surname include:

 Ailke Westerhof (1876–1946), Dutch Red Cross nurse during World War I
 Angelique Westerhof (born 1969), Dutch fashionista
 Boy Westerhof (born 1985), Dutch tennis player 
 Clemens Westerhof (born 1940), Dutch football manager
 Hans Westerhof (born 1948), Dutch football manager
 Lisa Westerhof (born 1981), Dutch sailor 
 Marieke Westerhof (born 1974), Dutch rower

See also
 Westerhoff, surname
 Westerhof syndrome, cutaneous condition named after Dutch dermatologist Wiete Westerhof (born 1944)
 Westerhof–Beemer–Cormane syndrome, another such condition

References

Dutch-language surnames
Dutch toponymic surnames